The Brady Bunch Hour is an American variety show featuring skits and songs produced by Sid & Marty Krofft Productions in association with Paramount Television. It ran on ABC from November 28, 1976, to May 25, 1977.

The series starred the original cast members of The Brady Bunch, with the exception of Eve Plumb, who was replaced by Geri Reischl (a.k.a. "Fake Jan"). The show began as a 60-minute special titled The Brady Bunch Variety Hour on November 28, 1976. The special garnered high ratings and led to eight additional 60-minute episodes which were produced and aired sporadically under the shortened title The Brady Bunch Hour from January 23 to May 25, 1977.

Later Brady Bunch revival series and TV reunion movies do not include or mention the show's events.

Premise 
When the family is chosen to star in a new variety series for ABC, Mike Brady gives up his architectural career and moves his family into a beach-side home somewhere in Southern California. In addition to the Brady clan, next-door-neighbor Jack Merrill (Rip Taylor) frequently finds his way into the act and is a love interest for the Bradys' maid, Alice (her former boyfriend, Sam the Butcher, is never mentioned). Each episode features the obligatory variety show song-and-dance numbers and sketches, as well as a show-within-a-show behind-the-scenes story which takes place in the Bradys' home.

Cast 
 Robert Reed as Mike Brady
 Florence Henderson as Carol Brady
 Ann B. Davis as Alice Nelson
 Barry Williams as Greg Brady
 Maureen McCormick as Marcia Brady
 Christopher Knight as Peter Brady
 Geri Reischl as Jan Brady
 Mike Lookinland as Bobby Brady
 Susan Olsen as Cindy Brady
 Rip Taylor as Jack Merrill

The Krofftettes and Water Follies
 Charkie Phillips
 Christine Cullen Wallace
 Susan Buckner
 Linda Hoxit
 Judy Susman
 Lynne Latham
 Dee Kaye
 Robyn Blythe

Background

Development 
In 1976, ABC president Fred Silverman concocted the idea of reuniting the cast of The Brady Bunch on an episode of the Donny & Marie variety show. Four cast members were booked and when the show aired on October 8, it was a ratings success, prompting Silverman to begin developing a variety show starring the Brady family. Donny & Marie producers Sid and Marty Krofft agreed to helm the show, as their paths had crossed with the Brady Bunch stars on numerous occasions, but no one bothered to seek the approval or involvement of Paramount Pictures (the producers and then-property holders of The Brady Bunch) or Sherwood Schwartz (the series creator). Both parties eventually gave their approval of the new series, mainly as a way to keep interest in the original series. The variety hour remains the only Brady project to not have Schwartz's involvement during production.

Casting 
Although Robert Reed's dissatisfaction with other Brady Bunch incarnations has become legendary, he quickly signed on to star in the variety show. Maureen McCormick recalled: "We joked that it was the first time any of us could remember him wanting to do something Brady-related". Barry Williams once wrote: "The Brady Bunch Hour was incredibly bad, but even more incredible was the fact that Robert Reed (who you'd expect would be foaming at the mouth about this mess) really enjoyed being on it". When Williams asked him why, Reed said: "I've studied voice and dancing. I'm terrible at both, and it proved to be true, but when Sid and Marty met with me, they described the whole thing in very positive terms and I thought, 'What fun! This'll be a hoot!" Quipped McCormick: "He sang and danced without caring that he was lousy and the show itself was worse. His inner Dorothy had found her calling".

Florence Henderson, the only cast member with real experience singing and dancing, was leery of the project but also agreed to appear, so the producers then set their sights on reuniting the Brady kids. Barry Williams was working on Broadway when he got a call from Marty Krofft, who pitched the show as "The Barry Williams Variety Hour with The Brady Bunch", promising the young entertainer featured solos and elaborate dance routines. Maureen McCormick was excited at the prospect of singing and working with the Krofft brothers; and Susan Olsen loved the idea of doing Saturday Night Live-type skits. Christopher Knight had turned his back on the entertainment industry and was aware of his own singing/dancing limitations, but he agreed to do the show when he was promised that his work would be limited to the opening and closing numbers and comedy sketches. Knight later said that it did not work that way "and I learned one of life's lessons—always get it in writing!" Mike Lookinland was uncomfortable dancing and had no desire to do the show, so he demanded twice the salary he was offered in hopes that the producers would be forced to recast his role.  To his surprise, this resulted in an increased salary for each cast member. Even then, he did not want to do the show and often skipped the rehearsals, until one day Florence Henderson found him in the parking lot and reminded him that they were all doing their job and "if his heart wasn't in it, neither should he be". Ann B. Davis had left Hollywood in 1974 and was working as a volunteer in a clergy house in Denver, Colorado when the series was hurried into production.   Originally, no one thought to include Davis, but at the last minute the crew decided to offer her a guest-starring role, which she retained throughout all nine episodes of the series. The producers made a deal which allowed her to be on the set only a few days a week so she could commute to Denver and fulfill her responsibilities to the church.

Contrary to popular belief, Eve Plumb was originally slated to appear in the variety hour. She said in her interview from 1976: "I wanted to do the show but there was a built-in option for thirteen more shows and possibly five years".  Plumb agreed to appear in five of the thirteen planned episodes, but when the network demanded that it was all-or-nothing, she backed out of the project. In late October 1976, producers scrambled to find a replacement and met with over 1500 hopefuls, eventually settling on Geri Reischl to fill the void. Reischl, who had extensive singing experience, auditioned several times and landed the role only one day before rehearsals began. Reischl's costars made her feel at home (Robert Reed told her it felt like she had always been a part of the Brady family, and she even developed a lasting friendship with Susan Olsen), but because of the recasting, Reischl was later dubbed "Fake Jan", a moniker which she has openly embraced.

After the pilot was shot, producers decided that they needed a regular comedian on the show, so Rip Taylor was brought aboard to portray the Bradys' realtor, moving man, next-door-neighbor, general Jack-of-all-trades and Alice's boyfriend, Mr. Jack Merrill. Like Reischl, Taylor felt welcomed by the cast—with the exception of Ann B. Davis, who barely spoke to him except when they were doing scenes. Series writer Mike Kagan commented that Rip Taylor is a "salty guy, he's got a dirty sense of humor and Ann B. Davis is a born-again Christian".

Krofftettes 
The Krofftettes were a dance troupe, who also performed water ballet created by Sid and Marty Krofft as a spin-off of The Ice Vanities, which performed skating routines on their other variety endeavor, Donny & Marie. When ABC programming executive Michael Eisner asked the Kroffts to create a new show for The Brady Bunch, Sid decided that the next best thing to ice would be a gigantic swimming pool, inspired by Esther Williams movies of the 1940s and 1950s. On October 25, 1976, the Kroffts held auditions for the group with choreographer Joe Cassini in the ABC headquarters at 1313 North Vine Street in Hollywood. There they met Charkie Phillips, a classically trained dancer from Florida and competitive swimmer with an extensive background in synchronised swimming. Phillips was selected to help Cassini choose dancers who could also handle the rigors of synchronised swimming.

Production 
The series was taped on Stage 2 at KTLA Studios in Los Angeles. The first episode was taped over three days beginning Monday, November 22, completing just days before its air date that Thanksgiving Sunday. The pool included windows along the sides of the tank to ease filming underwater. When the pool was first filled, early taping tests were unsuccessful. Assistant director Rick Locke commented that "it looked like milk".

Both the swimmers and stage crew faced many challenges with the swimming pool during production. Because the pool was located next door to the ice rink for Donny & Marie on Stage 1, the Krofftettes entered and exited the water in frigid air temperatures while rehearsing for the pilot episode. This caused steam to rise out of the water. Attempts to equalize the temperature of both the water and air then turned the pool into a warm bath.

Unlike traditional synchronized swimming, the Krofftettes were expected to sit on the bottom of the pool floor in various formations. In order to accomplish this, the women had to completely exhale all of their breath so that they would sink in a state of hypoxia. The ABC network would not allow the use of goggles and any unsightly air bubble escaping from a desperate nostril was absolutely forbidden. Because the Krofftettes had double duty as dancers on stage with the Bradys during the day, swimming sequences were often relegated to late night hours. This required the women to work more than 15 consecutive hours on days they were filming.

Other hazards with the swimming pool included props weighed to the bottom, which presented unwelcome obstructions. In addition, the Kroffts decided in one production number to have gas canisters in the pool, which they ignited during filming as a special effect. The Krofftettes were also forced to smear Vaseline into their scalp so that everything would stay in place while under water. This could only be removed with a recipe of Spic and Span along with Joy, which turned everyone's hair green. Turbans and other head pieces were then used for the remainder of the series.

The Krofftettes were the first water ballet troupe to be recorded on video tape, which presented its own set of challenges. The Kroffts experimented with an underwater camera, but relied more on large porthole windows in which cameras taped from outside of the pool itself. Cast, crew, and visitors alike were known to visit the stage and observe the young women during rehearsals through these windows, which included Chevy Chase and Paul Shaffer who were working at the studio on a television special. According to Shaffer, Chase would cut production meetings short so that everyone could go watch the Krofftettes.

Apart from the first episode, the production crew were very resistant to the expense of doing multiple takes, even allowing bloopers to appear in the finished episodes rather than re-shooting the sequences.

Scheduling 
The show was intended to air every fifth week in the same slot as The Hardy Boys/Nancy Drew Mysteries, but was scheduled sporadically throughout the season, leading to inconsistent ratings. A promo was often shown with Reed and Henderson stating, "The Brady Bunch Variety Hour won't be seen this week, but we will be back again soon".

Episodes

Home media 
The first and fourth episodes were released on VHS and DVD in the United States in 2000 by Rhino Entertainment.

The Brady Bunch Variety Hour in popular culture 

 TV Guide listed the series at No. 4 in a 2002 compilation of the 50 worst television series in American history.
 The show is the subject of a 2009 coffee table book titled Love to Love You Bradys by Susan Olsen (Cindy Brady). It was released in September 2009 by ECW Press. In addition to many color photos and artwork, the book features over 100 new interviews including the Brady Bunch, Sid Krofft, Marty Krofft, Sherwood Schwartz, Bruce Vilanch, Rip Taylor, and Paul Shaffer.
 This show was parodied on a season three episode of That '70s Show ("Red Sees Red"). The entire family, due to a forced curfew, is sitting around watching the show and each one leaves separately in anger (Red himself remarking that "This show is crap!"). Kitty then daydreams that she and her own family are the stars of a similar show in which they perform "I've Got the Music in Me" before Charo makes a surprise appearance. As the daydream ends, Kitty remarks, "Oh no, this is crap".
 The show was also parodied as part of "The Simpsons Spin-Off Showcase", wherein the Simpson family stars in a variety show spin-off of their show titled The Simpson Family Smile-Time Variety Hour. It was noted during the show that Lisa Simpson had refused to participate (in much the same way Eve Plumb did), so she was replaced with a much older prom queen-type who also claimed to be Lisa.
 In a season three episode of Tiny Toon Adventures titled Grandma's Dead, Elmyra's pet hamster Jan Brady dies. Ultimately, she gets a new hamster which she also names Jan Brady and refers to as a "midseason replacement".
 In the Gilmore Girls episode "Application Anxiety", Rory and Lorelai are watching The Brady Bunch Variety Hour when Rory's Harvard application comes in the mail.

References

External links 
 Complete Guide to The Brady Bunch Hour
 BradyHour.com
 Retro Junk
 Interview with Linda Hoxit
 

The Brady Bunch
1970s American musical comedy television series
1970s American sketch comedy television series
1970s American variety television series
1976 American television series debuts
1977 American television series endings
American Broadcasting Company original programming
American television shows featuring puppetry
English-language television shows
Television series about children
Television series about families
Television series by CBS Studios
Television series by Sid and Marty Krofft Television Productions